Lisboa (Portuguese for "Lisbon") is the capital city of Portugal.

Lisboa may also refer to:

Places

Portugal
Distrito de Lisboa
Lisboa Region

Other
Lisboa Island (Antarctica)
Lisboa Island (Guinea-Bissau)

Other uses
Lisboa (surname), a Portuguese surname
Casino Lisboa (disambiguation)